{{Speciesbox
|image = VrieseaFosteriana.jpg
|image_caption = Vriesea fosteriana 'Red Chestnut|genus = Vriesea
|species = fosteriana
|authority = L.B. Smith
}}Vriesea fosteriana''' is a plant species in the genus Vriesea''. This species is endemic to Brazil.

References
L.B.Sm., Arq. Bot. Estado São Paulo, n.s., f.m., 1: 116 (1943).

BSI BCR Entry for 'Megan'

fosteriana
Flora of Brazil